The Rous Memorial Stakes was a flat horse race in Great Britain open to Thoroughbreds aged three years and over. It was run at Ascot Racecourse in June.

History
The Rous Memorial Stakes at Ascot was first run in 1878 as a one-mile race with a subscription of £10 each with £1000 added. The race commemorated Henry John Rous, who had died the previous year. Rous was the official handicapper and developed the Weight for Age system.

In the latter part of the nineteenth century there were several races run under the title of Rous Memorial Stakes, most notably a two-year-old race at Goodwood.

It has been discontinued.

Early winners

See also
 Horseracing in Great Britain
 List of British flat horse races

References

Flat races in Great Britain
Ascot Racecourse
Discontinued horse races